Denny or Dennie is a surname, and may refer to:

Denny baronets, three titles, including lists of titleholders
Anthony Denny, advisor to Henry VIII of England
Arthur A. Denny of the Denny Party, Seattle-area settler
Bill Denny (William Joseph Denny, 1872–1946), South Australian politician
Bob Denny, American robotic telescopes software developer 
Charles Clayton Dennie (1883–1971), American dermatologist
Charles R. Denny, American lawyer, government official, and executive
Collins Denny (1854–1943), American bishop of the Methodist Episcopal Church, South
Collins Denny Jr. (1899–1964), American pro-segregationist lawyer.
David Denny, Seattle founder
Ebenezer Denny, American mayor
Gideon Jacques Denny (1830–1886), American marine artist
Harmar Denny, US Congressman
Harmar D. Denny Jr., US Congressman
Harold Denny, American war correspondent
James C. Denny, American politician
Jay Denny, American soccer player
Jerry Denny (1859–1927), American baseball player
Joanna Denny, historian
John Denny, American baseball player
John Denny (politician) (1793–1875), American politician
Joseph Dennie (1768–1812), American author and journalist
Mark Denny, American biologist
Martin Denny (1911–2005), American musician
Peter Denny (1821–1895), Scottish shipbuilder and shipowner
Rev. Peter Denny (1917–2009), English railway modeller
Reginald Leigh Denny (1891–1967), British-born actor
Reginald Oliver Denny, American attacked on live TV
Ross Denny (born 1955), British diplomat and ambassador
Sandy Denny, British singer and songwriter
Simon Denny, New Zealand artist
Simone Denny, Canadian singer
T. A. Denny, Irish businessman
Wally Denny, Deputy Chief Scout of the Boy Scouts of Canada
William Denny (disambiguation) several persons, including:
 William Denny (MP) (1578–1625), English lawyer and politician
 William Denny Jr. (born 1930), American politician in the Mississippi House of Representatives
 William Denny and Brothers, British shipbuilder based in Dumbarton, Scotland
 William F. Denny (c. 1860–1908), American vaudeville performer and pioneer recording artist
 William H. P. Denny (1811–1890), American journalist and politician in Ohio

See also
Denny (disambiguation)
Denney (disambiguation)
Denning (disambiguation)